Caroline Christine Horwath is a New Zealand nutritional scientist and professor in the Department of Human Nutrition at the University of Otago.

Academic career 
Horwath graduated from the University of Adelaide with a PhD in 1987. Her thesis was titled "A random population study of the dietary habits of elderly people". She subsequently joined the University of Otago as a lecturer in the Department of Human Nutrition. In December 2019 she, along with two of her colleagues Lisa Houghton and Rachel Brown, was promoted to full professor with effect from 1 February 2020.

Selected works

References

External links 

 

Living people
Year of birth missing (living people)
University of Adelaide alumni
Academic staff of the University of Otago
New Zealand women academics
New Zealand women scientists